Cabocla is a Brazilian telenovela produced and broadcast by TV Globo. It premiered on 10 May 2004, replacing Chocolate com Pimenta, and ended on 20 November 2004, replaced by Como uma Onda. The telenovela is written by Ricardo Waddington, with the collaboration of Edmara Barbosa and Edilene Barbosa. It is based on the 1979 telenovela of the same name and originally shown on Rede Globo.

It stars Vanessa Giácomo, Daniel de Oliveira, Tony Ramos, Patrícia Pillar, Mauro Mendonça, Carolina Kasting, Regiane Alves, Danton Mello, Eriberto Leão, Maria Flor and Malvino Salvador in the leading roles.

Plot 
Louis Jerome is a rich young man. A womanizer, he spends all night drinking and having fun with prostitutes, but then he discovers that he is suffering from pneumonia.

On the advice of Edmund Esteves, his doctor, he decides to spend a season on the farm of a cousin in the town of Vila da Mata Espirito Santo, in search of fresh air, to prevent the disease from developing into tuberculosis, a very common occurrence among bohemians in that period of history - the late 1910s, approximately in 1918.

When Louis Jerome comes to town, he stays in the hotel of the couple Bina Sinha, an Indian, and Joe Station, the grandson of a Portuguese, to wait for his cousin, Colonel Boanerges, who will take him to his farm.

In just one night at the hotel, he marvels at the daughter of Joe and Bina, the half-breed shy and aloof Zuca. To fall in love, they face much resistance because of social differences and the fact that Zuca is portrayed as stubborn.

Their love is also challenged by the arrival of the Spanish Pepa, who us in love with Luis, and who is a former lover of the rich young man. She is established on the neighboring farm, owned by Colonel Justin, a widower, and Colonel Boanerges' political enemy.

Beside the main plot, a political row unfolds between the two colonels in the region: Boanerges and Justin, rivals in politics and in a local power struggle.

Alongside this struggle, there is the true love story of Cats and Neco. She is the daughter of Boanerges and Emerenciana, he, of Justin, which makes this a kind of Romeo and Juliet hillbilly match.

Neco becomes a new leader in the town. Well-intentioned, he may work for the people of the region, even facing the might of the colonels.

Amid all this, the feelings of Mariquinha, daughter of Colonel Justin and sister of Neco by Tobias, surface, causing a love quartet to result, together with the love of Louis Jerome and Zuca.

Cast 
 Vanessa Giácomo as Zuca (Zulmira de Oliveira Vieira Pires)
 Daniel de Oliveira as Luís Jerônimo Vieira Pires
 Patrícia Pillar as Emerenciana de Sousa Pereira (Ciana)
 Tony Ramos as Coronel Boanerges de Sousa Pereira
 Malvino Salvador as Tobias de Oliveira Pinto
 Mauro Mendonça as Coronel Justino (Manuel Justino Caldas) 
 Carolina Kasting as Mariquinha (Maria Junqueira Caldas de Oliveira Pinto)
 Regiane Alves as Belinha (Elizabeth Emerenciana de Sousa Pereira Junqueira Caldas)
 Danton Mello as Neco (Manuel Junqueira Caldas)
 Eriberto Leão as Tomé
 Reginaldo Faria as Joaquim Vieira Pires
 Sebastião Vasconcelos as Felício Pinto
 Vera Holtz as Generosa de Oliveira Pinto
 Otávio Augusto as Zé da Estação (José de Oliveira)
 Jussara Freire as Siá Bina (Balbina de Oliveira)
 Othon Bastos as Dr. Edmundo Esteves
 Oscar Magrini as Capitão Macário
 John Herbert as Vigário Gabriel
 Umberto Magnani as Coronel Chico Bento (Francisco Bento)
 Alexandre Rodrigues as Zaqueu
 Mareliz Rodrigues as Pequetita Novais Vieira Pires
 Maria Flor as Tina (Cristina de Oliveira Pinto)
 Elena Toledo as Pepa, la Sevillana (Pepa Junqueira Caldas)
 Roberta Rodrigues as Julieta
 Cosme dos Santos as Nastácio
 Cláudio Gabriel as Onofre
 Edyr de Castro as Maria
 Rogério Falabella as Dr. Teles
 Aisha Jambo as Ritinha
 Cláudio Galvan as Chico da Venda (Francisco do Espírito Santo)
 Vitor Hugo as Tião
 Renata Di Carmo as Rute
 Fernando Petelinkar as Xexéu

External links

2004 Brazilian television series debuts
2004 telenovelas
TV Globo telenovelas
2004 Brazilian television series endings
Brazilian telenovelas
Portuguese-language telenovelas